Bob Dylan's Greatest Hits Volume 3 is a compilation LP album by Bob Dylan, released on Columbia Records on compact disc and cassette tape in 1994, Columbia catalogue number 66783.

Content
It encompasses recordings released between the years 1973 and 1991, the time period since the previous volume of the series, released in 1971. All of Dylan's studio albums from this time span are represented, with the exceptions of: Dylan, compiled by Columbia without Dylan's input; The Basement Tapes, consisting of material predating this time period; Saved; and Empire Burlesque. The track "Groom's Still Waiting at the Altar" was added to later pressings of Shot of Love after initially being released on the flipside of a single. It includes four Top 40 singles and one previously unreleased track, an outtake from the sessions for Oh Mercy, the song "Dignity" with a new backing track overdubbed and produced in the autumn of 1994 by Brendan O'Brien.

Six of its tracks had been released as singles in the United States. The liner notes provide a more detailed track-by-track personnel listing.

In 2003, this album was released along with the other two Dylan greatest hits sets in one four-disc package, as Greatest Hits Volumes I–III.

Track listing
All songs written by Bob Dylan, except where noted.

Notes

1994 greatest hits albums
Albums produced by Barry Beckett
Albums produced by Bob Dylan
Albums produced by Brendan O'Brien (record producer)
Albums produced by Chuck Plotkin
Albums produced by Daniel Lanois
Albums produced by Don DeVito
Albums produced by Don Was
Albums produced by Jerry Wexler
Albums produced by Mark Knopfler
Bob Dylan compilation albums
Columbia Records compilation albums
Albums produced by David Was